DRBC can stand for:

Democratic Reform British Columbia, a Canadian political party
Delaware River Basin Commission, an American water management agency